The École Polytechnique d'Ingénieurs de l'Université de Savoie is a French engineering College created in 2006.

It has been created from the merger of the École Supérieure d'Ingénieurs (ESIA) and the École Supérieure d'Ingénieurs de Chambéry (ESIGEC).

The school trains engineers in five majors :

 Building
 Industrial Ecology
 Computer science
 Mechanical
 Digital Systems - Instrumentation

Located in Annecy, Polytech Annecy-Chambéry is a public higher education institution. The school is a member of the Savoy Mont Blanc University.

References

External links
 Homepage of the University

Annecy
Education in Annecy
Universities and colleges in Chambéry
Educational institutions established in 2006
Polytech Annecy Chambery
Annecy
2006 establishments in France